Sir William Norris (1501 – 30 January 1568), of Speke, Lancashire, was an English Member of Parliament.

He was the eldest son of Henry Norris of Speke whom he succeeded in 1524. He was knighted in 1531.

He was appointed High Sheriff of Lancashire for 1544–45 and served as a Justice of the Peace for Cheshire in 1547. He was Mayor of Liverpool for 1554–55.

He was elected a Member (MP) of the Parliament of England for Liverpool in April 1554.

He died in 1568 and was buried in Childwall. He had married twice: firstly Ellen, the daughter of Rowland Bulkeley of Beaumaris, Anglesey, with whom he had a son and 6 daughters and secondly Anne, the daughter and coheiress of David Myddelton of Chester, Cheshire, and the widow of Thomas Seton, with whom he had another 6 sons and 6 daughters. He was succeeded by his third but eldest surviving son Edward. His eldest son, William, had been killed at the battle of Pinkie in 1547.

References

 

1501 births
1568 deaths
Members of the Parliament of England (pre-1707) for Liverpool
English MPs 1554
High Sheriffs of Lancashire
Mayors of Liverpool
People from Speke